Bronisław Waligóra (born 25 September 1932) is a Polish football player and coach.

Career

Playing career
Waligóra played for AKS Chorzów, Pomorzanin Toruń and Zawisza Bydgoszcz.

Coaching career
Waligóra managed Zawisza Bydgoszcz, Widzew Łódź, Motor Lublin, Bałtyk Gdynia, Lech Poznań, Avia Świdnik and Hetman Zamość.

References

1932 births
Living people
Polish footballers
Association football forwards
AKS Chorzów players
Zawisza Bydgoszcz players
Polish football managers
Zawisza Bydgoszcz managers
Widzew Łódź managers
Motor Lublin managers
Bałtyk Gdynia managers
Lech Poznań managers
Avia Świdnik managers
Hetman Zamość managers
Place of birth missing (living people)